The annual election to Swansea County Borough Council took place in November 1891. It was followed by the 1892 election.

Ward Results

Alexandra

Brynmelin

Castle

East

Ffynone

Landore

Morriston

St Helen's

St John's (three seats)

Victoria (one seat)

References

1891
Swansea County Borough
19th century in Swansea